Metro by T-Mobile (formerly known as MetroPCS and also known simply as Metro) is an American prepaid virtual wireless service provider and brand owned by T-Mobile US. It previously operated the fifth largest mobile telecommunications network in the United States using code-division multiple access (CDMA). In 2013, the carrier engaged in a reverse merger with T-Mobile US; post-merger, its services were merged under T-Mobile's UMTS and LTE network. Metro by T-Mobile competes primarily against Dish's Boost Mobile, AT&T's Cricket Wireless and Verizon's Visible as part of the wireless service provider brands.

History

Early history
Metro was established in 1994 as General Wireless, Inc., by Roger Linquist and Malcolm Lorang. PCS referred to the industry term, Personal Communications Service. Its service was first launched in 2002.

As of February 2005, MetroPCS had about 1.5 million subscribers in the country. At the time, the company operated through 21 licenses in Greater Miami, Tampa, Sarasota, New York City, San Francisco, Atlanta and Sacramento. The company expanded to the Dallas and Detroit areas later that year.

On April 19, 2007, MetroPCS made its stock market debut. Its $50 million share IPO closed at $27.40, for a market cap of $8 billion. and then expanded over to New York promptly in 2002.

Merger with T-Mobile
In October 2012, the company, known then as MetroPCS, reached an agreement to merge with T-Mobile USA. A reverse merger for MetroPCS, the deal closed on May 1, 2013. The combined company, now known as T-Mobile US, began trading on the New York Stock Exchange. On June 21, 2015, the legacy MetroPCS CDMA network was decommissioned, and customers were migrated to the company's LTE network.

At the time of the merger, T-Mobile had about 32 million subscribers, to which MetroPCS added around 9 million.

In 2012, there was a series of armed robberies in Metro stores which was attributed to low security measures. In the same year,  T-Mobile and Metro became some of the earliest companies to offer unlimited data plans.

Rebranding 

On September 24, 2018, T-Mobile announced that it would relaunch the brand as Metro by T-Mobile (a move that would take effect two weeks later), introducing new unlimited plans offering bundled features such as Amazon Prime subscriptions and Google One storage, and announcing that the brand aims to be the first prepaid mobile carrier to offer 5G in 2019. T-Mobile stated that these changes would help to reduce the negative stigmas associated with MetroPCS's prepaid services, by aligning them with other well-known brands as value-added services, and placing a larger emphasis on its use of T-Mobile's network. The renamed carrier launched in early October 2018. At the time of the name change, T-Mobile's subscriber number had increased to around 75 million and Metro's had doubled to around 18 million users and had increased their nationwide market reach from around 12 to 100 markets.

In November 2022, Metro by T-Mobile would quietly remove the Amazon Prime benefit from their advertised plans for new customers.  Current customers would still be grandfathered in and a few new customers could still get Amazon Prime in their plans by calling customer service and have it manually added.

Corporate affairs

Products
Metro is T-Mobile US's branch of prepaid services, currently offering a selection of 31 smartphones and four data plans as of March 18, 2019.

Metro conducts its operations on their physical store locations only, in contrast with other prepaid brands that offer services on physical locations and online.

Advertising
In February 2019, the company announced a new long-term advertising campaign featuring Milwaukee Bucks player Giannis Antetokounmpo.

Reception

Network quality
The launch of MetroPCS's LTE network was met with mixed reviews. In November 2010, Gigaom's Kevin Tofel noted that although the LTE network was based on 4G technology, "the infrastructure MetroPCS is using keeps speeds in the range of older 3G networks". Tofel measured data speeds "far slower than T-Mobile's HSPA+ network" but considered that users with only basic data requirements would find the no-contract deal "refreshing." Referencing Tofel's review, Laptop Mag's Corvida Raven concluded that MetroPCS "probably isn't using the best LTE technology."

Slate's Farhad Manjoo panned the service by suggesting that MetroPCS was able to roll out 4G coverage sooner and cheaper than its competitors by offering only the Samsung Craft, a feature phone with sub-standard internet capabilities, as its launch device. Due to the quality of the device (described as being "designed not just to frustrate users but to get us to swear off ever using any phone again"), the network, and MetroPCS's decision to block video streaming services aside from YouTube under its "unlimited web" plan, Manjoo considered it a device designed to disappoint users excited for 4G.

Marketing
MetroPCS attracted criticism in 2010 for an advertising campaign featuring two Indian characters, Ranjit and Chad (the former being played by veteran Indian actor Anjul Nigam), hosting a phone-in show titled Tech & Talk. Their content was believed to be stereotypical and offensive.

Following the T-Mobile merger, MetroPCS introduced a campaign to highlight its inclusion of all related taxes and fees in advertised prices. The campaign was ridiculed by many people who interpreted an unintended double meaning in the slogan, referring to the menstrual cycle.

Awards
Metro ranked first in customer experience among the non-contract full-service carriers in the 2018 and 2019 J.D. Power U.S. Wireless Purchase Experience Non-Contract Performance Studies.

See also
 T-Mobile US
 List of mobile network operators of the Americas

References

External links
 
 Official Instagram site

T-Mobile US
Telecommunications companies established in 1994
Retail companies established in 1994
American companies established in 1994
Deutsche Telekom
Mobile phone companies of the United States
Mobile virtual network operators
Companies based in Richardson, Texas
2013 mergers and acquisitions
Companies formerly listed on the New York Stock Exchange